Wardell Gray (February 13, 1921 – May 25, 1955) was an American jazz tenor saxophonist who straddled the swing and bebop periods.

Biography

Early years
Gray was born in Oklahoma City, the youngest of four children. He spent his early childhood years in Oklahoma, before he and his family moved to Detroit in 1929.

In early 1935, Gray began attending Northeastern High School, then transferred to Cass Technical High School, noted for having Donald Byrd, Lucky Thompson and Al McKibbon as alumni. He left in 1936, before graduating. Advised by his brother-in-law Junior Warren, as a teenager he started on the clarinet, but after hearing Lester Young on record with Count Basie, he was inspired to switch to tenor saxophone.

Gray's first musical job was in Isaac Goodwin's small band, a part-time outfit that played local dances. When auditioning for another job, he was heard by Dorothy Patton, a young pianist who was forming a band in the Fraternal Club in Flint, Michigan, and she hired him. After a very happy year there, he moved to Jimmy Raschel's band (Raschel had recorded a few sides earlier in the 1930s but did not do so again), then to the Benny Carew band in Grand Rapids, Michigan. It was at around this time that he met Jeanne Goings; together they had a daughter, Anita, who was born in January 1941.

With the Earl Hines Orchestra
Just up the road from the Congo Club was the Three Sixes; A young dancer Jeri Walker knew Earl Hines, and when the Hines band came through Detroit in late 1943, she persuaded Earl to hire Wardell—on alto, since there was no tenor vacancy at the time.

This was a big break for the 21-year-old, as the Earl Hines Orchestra was not only nationally known, but had nurtured the careers of some of the emerging bebop musicians, including Dizzy Gillespie and Charlie Parker. Although most of them had left by the time Gray joined, playing with the Hines band was still a lively and stimulating experience for the young tenor player. They toured the country, and it was when they were in California that Gray met Dorothy Duvall. She was married but, although the marriage was on the point of collapse, an unfortunate intervention by a "friend" led Gray to believe that this was not so, and he returned to Jeri; they were married in Chicago in September 1945.

Wardell spent approximately three years with Hines, and matured rapidly. He was soon a featured soloist, and the band's recordings show a relaxed, fluent stylist very much in the Lester Young mold. While some of the live Jubilee sessions have been reissued on CD (1), the studio recordings from 1945-46 are still available only on LP.

Arrival on the West Coast
He left Hines late in 1946, settling in Los Angeles, California; soon after arriving there, he recorded the first session under his own name. This was a quartet session for Eddie Laguna's Sunset label, and on it Wardell had strong support from Dodo Marmarosa on piano. The date produced some excellent sides, notably "Easy Swing" and "The Man I Love"; there is a reissue of the whole session, including alternate takes (2), but a selection is available on (12).

In Los Angeles, Wardell worked in a number of bands including Benny Carter, the blues singer Ivory Joe Hunter, and the small group that supported singer Billy Eckstine on a tour of the West Coast. But the real focus in LA at this time was in the clubs along Central Avenue, which was still thriving after the boom years brought about by the huge injection of wartime defence spending. Here Wardell found his element, playing in the mainly after-hours sessions in clubs such as Jack's Basket Room, the Down Beat, Lovejoy's and the Club Alabam, and his early success in these sessions led Ross Russell to include him in a studio session he was organising for his Dial label. The session was designed as a showcase for Charlie Parker, but Wardell acquitted himself superbly, showing no sign at all of being over-awed by Parker's presence (3).

It was in the Central Avenue clubs that Wardell held his tenor battles with Dexter Gordon. These two were ideally matched: Wardell's light sound and swift delivery were more than a match for Dexter's big, blustering sound, and their tenor jousts became a kind of symbol for the Central Avenue scene. Gordon later recalled: "There'd be a lot of cats on the stand but by the end of the session it would wind up with Wardell and myself.... His playing was very fluid, very clean.... He had a lot of drive and a profusion of ideas". Their fame began to spread, and Ross Russell managed to get them to simulate one of their battles on "The Chase" (4), which became Wardell's first nationally known recording and has been assessed as "one of the most exciting musical contests in the history of jazz".

The success of "The Chase" was the break that Wardell needed, and he became increasingly prominent in public sessions in and around LA, including the "Just Jazz" series of jam sessions organised by the disc jockey Gene Norman. There were concerts at the Pasadena Civic Auditorium and the Shrine Auditorium and other venues (5, 6, 7). The session, which included "Just You, Just Me" and "Sweet Georgia Brown", has some of Wardell's best playing, but the only CD version of this is crudely abbreviated. (Several unedited versions of these performances have since been issued.) A 1947 concert at the Elks Ballroom in Los Angeles featured both Wardell and Dexter Gordon, and included an 18-minute performance released on 8 78 RPM records as "The Hunt"; the entire concert has been released as a 3-CD set(21)

Benny Goodman and Count Basie
Apart from a spell with a small band led by Al Killian (some Jubilee recordings by this group (8) show Wardell in fine form) Wardell was still working mainly in one-off sessions during 1947. However, at a concert around the turn of that year which also featured Benny Goodman, Wardell so impressed the clarinettist that Goodman hired him for a small group which he was just setting up as part of his flirtation with bebop. Goodman had previously been highly critical of bop playing but, speaking of Wardell to Metronome magazine, he said that "if he's bop, that's great. He's wonderful!"

Goodman's new group included the young Swedish clarinettist Ake "Stan" Hasselgard and, initially, Teddy Wilson, and it opened at Frank Palumbo's Click Club in Philadelphia in May 1948. Enthusiasts recorded the nightly broadcasts from the club, some of the best of which have been released on CD (9), and they contain some superbly relaxed, fluent tenor work from Wardell. There is little sign of bop in the group's playing, the only noticeable influence being in some of Wardell's phrasing and in aspects of Mary Lou Williams' arrangements for the band.

The group was not, however, a financial success and Goodman eventually broke it up, but by now Wardell was fully established on the East Coast as an up-and-coming musician. For a while in late 1948/early 1949 he worked with the Count Basie Orchestra, while also managing to record with Tadd Dameron (10) and, in excellent quartet and quintet sessions, with Al Haig (11, 12). The quartet session included "Twisted", one of Wardell's best-known recordings which was used as the basis for a best-selling vocalese version by Annie Ross.

Wardell left Basie in 1949 to return to Benny Goodman. However, life in the Goodman band became increasingly uncongenial for him. In addition, his marriage to Jeri was breaking up. Goodman was not an easy employer at the best of times and this, combined with the constant travelling, made Wardell increasingly unhappy: recordings of the band, both studio sessions (13) and live airshots (14, 15), feature work by Wardell that is below his own best standards. (That it is the Goodman surroundings that was the problem, rather than any fall-off in Wardell's ability, is shown in a session recorded with local musicians in Detroit (11, 18); Wardell's work on this session is exemplary).

On leaving Goodman, Wardell rejoined Count Basie. Basie had bowed to economic pressures and broken up his big band, forming a septet which included Clark Terry and Buddy DeFranco; Wardell joined them in, probably, July 1950. This setting was a much happier one for him and the group enjoyed some success; airshots from the time show a very relaxed, swinging band with no weak links (16).

It was during this good time from a musical point of view, that Wardell's personal life also became happier. He was finally divorced from Jeri and was at last free to marry Dorothy and, together with Dorothy's daughter, Paula, they set up in a little house in Los Angeles.

The only drawback to working with Basie (who had by now enlarged his group again to big band size) was the constant travelling, and Wardell eventually decided to leave so that he could enjoy more home life. The decision was entirely understandable, though the Basie rhythm section was ideally suited to Wardell's brand of swing and, from a musical point of view, enthusiasts for his playing may regret his decision. And an unexpected side-effect was that, because work in the LA area was short (for black musicians, anyway) Wardell still had to travel frequently in search of jobs. Nevertheless, life at home was good, and one of the few interviews that he ever gave (to the British Melody Maker) showed that he was very happy.

In 1950, Gray played a live concert at the San Francisco Veteran's Memorial Hall as a guest with Gerald Wilson's band.  Remarkably captured in high fidelity stereo (the only such example in his discography), this recording was released for the first time in 2006 (17). Gray can be heard in fine form during featured solo spots with small combo backup on "Nice Work if You Can Get It" and "Indiana" and also with Wilson's big band on the blues "Hollywood Freeway" where Gray trades exciting choruses with Zoot Sims and Stan Getz.

The decline
At around this time his recording sessions started becoming fewer—though a live session with Dexter Gordon, recreating the excitements of Central Avenue, and a studio session with Art Farmer and Hampton Hawes (both on 18), have fine examples of Wardell's playing.

However, there are increasing signs of a lack of engagement in Wardell's work around 1951/52, notably in a further live session with Dexter Gordon from February 1952 (5), and it seems that he may have been becoming disillusioned with the music business. That he was still capable of playing superbly is shown by his work on a live jam session at The Haig (19), but such sessions were by now very sparse, and more typical work from this period was recorded on a session with Teddy Charles (17).

At around this time, Gray apparently became involved with drugs; friends reported that this was taking its toll. His playing was now less fluent, and a studio session in January 1955 (12), which was to be his last, shows strong but (by his own standards) rather unsubtle playing.

Disappearance and death
Gray was still working regularly despite his drug problems, and when Benny Carter was engaged in May 1955 to provide the band at the opening of the Moulin Rouge Hotel, he called on Gray. Gray attended rehearsals but was absent when the club opened on May 25. The next day he was found on a stretch of desert on the outskirts of Las Vegas dead with a broken neck.

Although various sources still describe the circumstances of Gray's death as mysterious, the closing note of a solography on the tribute web site wardellgray.org states that "The circumstances are now clear (ref. Han Schulte interviewing Teddy Edwards in the late 80s): Teddy was on the spot, May 1955 in Las Vegas, when WG died in his hotel room after an overdose. His friends, working with the group of Benny Carter in LA, wanted no police trouble, so they put his body in a car and brought it to the desert. By unloading, the body fell on the ground and his neck was broken. That's it."

In popular culture

James Ellroy's novel The Cold Six Thousand contains a reference to Gray's disappearance and death: according to this, he was murdered by (fictional) racist conspirator Wayne Tedrow, Sr. for having an affair with his wife, Janice.

Bill Moody's book Death of a Tenor Man tells the story of a contemporary investigation of Wardell's death by fictional detective/pianist Evan Horne.

Jack Kerouac explicitly references Wardell in his novel On the Road:
"They ate voraciously as Neal, sandwich in hand, stood bowed and jumping before the big phonograph listening to a wild bop record I just bought called 'The Hunt', with Dexter Gordon and Wardell Gray blowing their tops before a screaming audience that gave the record fantastic frenzied volume."

Joni Mitchell included a version of the Ross/Gray song "Twisted" on her double-platinum album Court and Spark.

Discography
(cross-indexed to the text above)

LaserLight 15 766 (Earl Fatha Hines And His Orchestra)
Black Lion Records BLCD 760106 (Wardell Gray: One For Prez) these sessions are also available on The Complete Sunset and New Jazz Masters CD.
Spotlite SPJ-(CD) 109-2 (Charlie Parker: The Dial Masters) 2-CD set
Spotlite SPJ-(CD) 130 (Dexter Gordon: Dexter Gordon On Dial - The Complete Sessions)
Giants of Jazz CD 53064 (Wardell Gray: The Chase ...Guest: Dexter Gordon)
Giants of Jazz CD 53097 (Various Artists: An Unforgettable Session) live recordings from a 1947 Gene Norman Presents "JUST JAZZ" concert at The Civic Auditorium in Pasadena, California.
Savoy SV-0164, SV-0165, SV-0166 (Various Artists: Jazz West Coast Live/Hollywood Jazz Live - Volumes 1, 2, 3)
Fresh Sound FSR-CD 156 (Sonny Criss: California Boppin) 1947
Dragon DRCD 183 (Stan Hasselgard & Benny Goodman: Hasselgard and Goodman At Click) 1948
Blue Note CDP 72438 33373 23 (Fats Navarro & Tadd Dameron: The Complete Blue Note and Capitol Recordings) 2-CD set
Cool And Blue C&B-CD 116 (Wardell Gray: Light Gray) 1948–1950
Swingtime ST CD1 (Wardell Gray: Easy Swing) 1946–1955
Capitol CDP 72438 32086 23 (Benny Goodman: Undercurrent Blues)
Hep CD36 (Benny Goodman: Benny's Bop) 1948–1949
Jazz Archives 90.510-2 (Benny Goodman)
Moon MCD 076-2 (Wardell Gray: How High The Moon)
Jazz Factory JFCD 22880  (Gerald Wilson: Big Band Modern)
Original Jazz Classics OJCCD-050-2 (Wardell Gray Memorial - Volume 1) compilation of sessions for Prestige Records from 1949, 1950 and 1953.
Original Jazz Classics OJCCD-051-2 (Wardell Gray Memorial - Volume 2) another Prestige compilation, these sessions are from 1950 and 1952.
Fresh Sound FSR-CD 157 (Wardell Gray Quintet - Live At The Haig) 1952
Savoy SVY17441 (3-CD set) (Bopland) 1947

As sidemanWith Louis BellsonJust Jazz All-Stars (Capitol, 1952)
Skin Deep (Norgran, 1953)With Frank Morgan'''Frank Morgan (Gene Norman Presents, 1955)

Further reading
 Gioia, Ted (1992). West Coast Jazz: Modern Jazz in California, 1945-1960. University of California Press. .
 Moody, Bill (1995). Death Of A Tenor Man, Dell Publishing, .
 Bjorn, Lars and Jim Gallert (2001). Before Motown: A History of Jazz in Detroit, 1920-60''. University of Michigan Press. .

References

External links
 Abraham Ravett's site 'Forgotten Tenor' based around his film on Wardell
 
 Wardell Gray Website: This site provides a full discography, chronology and many other features about Wardell Gray
 Album: Way Out Wardell, With Wardell Gray, Erroll Garner, Vido Musso (ts), Howard McGhee (tp), Arnold Ross (p), Barney Kessel (g), Harry Babasin (b), Don Lamond (ds), Recorded：Los Angeles, CA, February 27, 1947.

1921 births
1955 deaths
Musicians from Oklahoma City
Musicians from Detroit
Jazz tenor saxophonists
American jazz tenor saxophonists
American male saxophonists
Bebop saxophonists
Cass Technical High School alumni
Count Basie Orchestra members
Benny Goodman Orchestra members
Savoy Records artists
Prestige Records artists
20th-century American musicians
20th-century saxophonists
Jazz musicians from Michigan
American male jazz musicians
20th-century American male musicians